Thylacosceles acridomima, also known as the pūniu spore-eater or the micro-featherfoot, is a moth of the family Stathmopodidae. This species is endemic to New Zealand. It was first described by Edward Meyrick in 1889.

Description
The mature larva of this species is between 5 to 6 mm long and is short and fat with a whitish flesh coloured body and pale brown head.

Meyrick described the adult male of this species as follows:

Behaviour
The larvae of this species create a silk tunnel on the underside of fronds of their host species. The adults of this species are on the wing from October to January.

Hosts
The larval host of this species is Polystichum vestitum. The larvae feed on the spores of this plant.

References

Moths of New Zealand
Moths described in 1889
Stathmopodidae
Endemic fauna of New Zealand
Taxa named by Edward Meyrick
Endemic moths of New Zealand